Andreas von Flotow (6 June 1876 – 17 January 1950) was a German equestrian. He competed in the individual dressage event at the 1912 Summer Olympics.

References

External links
 

1876 births
1950 deaths
German male equestrians
Olympic equestrians of Germany
Equestrians at the 1912 Summer Olympics
People from Ludwigslust-Parchim